The 2022 FIFA World Cup was an association football tournament took place in November and December 2022 involved 32 men's national teams from nations affiliated to the International Federation of Association Football (FIFA). The tournament was broadcast all over the world.

Host broadcaster
As with all FIFA World Cup matches since the 2002 edition, the production of the 'world television feed' will be by Host Broadcast Services (HBS), part of Infront Sports & Media. Matches will be captured in Ultra-high-definition (UHD) and HLG High-dynamic-range (HDR), with 5.1 surround sound. The 'world feed' is then used by rights holding broadcasters around the world.

Broadcasters

Notes

References

Broadcasting rights
FIFA World Cup broadcasting rights